Life's a Beach is the debut studio album by English alternative R&B band Easy Life, released on 28 May 2021 through Island Records. Life's a Beach was preceded by five singles: "Daydreams", "A Message to Myself", "Skeletons", "Have a Great Day", and "Ocean View".

"Skeletons" is included on the soundtrack of the EA Sports game FIFA 22.

Critical reception

Life's a Beach received critical acclaim. On Metacritic, which assigns a normalised score of 100 to ratings from publications, the album received a score of 84 based on four reviews, indicating "universal acclaim".

Clash writer Robin Murray felt that the album was "a record you're sure to fall hopelessly in love with, its immediacy taps into the endless zen of those long summer days."

Writing for DIY, Will Richards noted that "Life's A Beachs lasting impact is its confrontation of depression and self-doubt: this is a record that will make you feel deeply as well as provide a soundtrack for your first post-lockdown festival".

Track listing

Personnel
Easy Life
 Murray Matravers – vocals, synthesiser, keyboard, trumpet
 Oliver Cassidy – drums, percussion
 Sam Hewitt – bass guitar, saxophone, vocals
 Lewis Alexander Berry – guitar
 Jordan Birtles – percussion, keyboard, vocals

Charts

References

External links
 

2021 debut albums
Easy Life albums
Island Records albums